Levantines in the United Arab Emirates may refer to:
 Jordanians in the United Arab Emirates
 Lebanese people in the United Arab Emirates
 Syrians in the United Arab Emirates

See also
 Expatriates in the United Arab Emirates